Patrick J. Fogarty (died 2 May 1947) was an Irish Fianna Fáil politician who served for ten years as a member of Dáil Éireann.

An insurance broker and bookmaker, Fogarty first stood for election to the Dáil at the 1937 general election for the Dublin County constituency, and was returned to the 9th Dáil. He was re-elected at the 1938, 1943 and 1944 general elections.

After his death, the Dublin County by-election for his Dáil seat was held on 29 October 1947, and won by the Clann na Poblachta candidate Seán MacBride.

References

Fianna Fáil TDs
Year of birth missing
1947 deaths
Members of the 9th Dáil
Members of the 10th Dáil
Members of the 11th Dáil
Members of the 12th Dáil